James Thomas Fallon (1823 – 26 May 1886) was an Irish-born Australian politician.

He was born at Athlone to farmer James Fallon and Margaret Norton. He migrated to Sydney in 1841 and operated a general store. He became a vigneron, being director of a Murray Valley-based company from 1858. In 1869 he was elected to the New South Wales Legislative Assembly for Hume, but he did not re-contest in 1872. His winery manufactured the first Australian champagne in 1876. Fallon died at Manly in 1886.

References

 

1823 births
1886 deaths
Members of the New South Wales Legislative Assembly
19th-century Australian politicians